The 2001 Dura Lube 400 was the second stock car race of the 2001 NASCAR Winston Cup Series. It was held on February 25, 2001 but ended on February 26 due to a rain delay at North Carolina Speedway, in Richmond County, North Carolina and was the first race to take place after the death of seven-time Winston Cup champion Dale Earnhardt on the last lap of the Daytona 500, and he was commemorated in various ways throughout the race weekend.

The race was delayed for more than 90 minutes before only competing for 52 laps when it was stopped due to rain falling on the race track. The race restarted the next day under sunny conditions. The race was won by Steve Park in the No.1 Chevrolet for Dale Earnhardt, Inc.; this was DEI's first win after Earnhardt's death in the previous race. This was also Kevin Harvick's debut in the Cup Series, as he replaced Earnhardt in the #3 (renumbered 29) Chevrolet for Richard Childress Racing.

Qualifying

Race recap

Pre-race ceremonies
Before the start, the race was delayed for 1 hour and 33 minutes. During this time, Darrell Waltrip led an invocation that commemorated Dale Earnhardt. Waltrip asked for all spectators to hold the hand of the person that sat next to them to bond and remember Earnhardt. Waltrip also performed a prayer asking for strength, pray for the Earnhardt family and asked for sadness to be turned for celebration towards Earnhardt's life. The invocation was joined by Staff Sgt. Joseph Hunter of Seymour Johnson Air Force Base who performed the national anthem which was to have been followed by three F-15 Strike Eagles from the 333rd Fighter Squadron of Seymour Johnson AFB that would have performed the missing man formation over the racetrack with the No. 3 missing man aircraft absent from the proceedings. This did not occur due to heavy cloud cover. During the national anthem, the three crews from Dale Earnhardt, Inc. stood atop their pit walls and raised their caps in the air and this continued when the drivers entered their cars. The pole position was left open during the parade lap in tribute to Earnhardt.

Race
On the first lap, Dale Earnhardt Jr. was bumped from behind by Ron Hornaday Jr. heading into turn 3 and sent it into Kenny Wallace's path, crashing at 150 mph at an angle with Earnhardt Jr. suffering bruising and a limp in his leg. Other cars involved were Jimmy Spencer, Mike Wallace and Hut Stricklin. Despite this, Earnhardt Jr. was taken by an ambulance to the medical center.

On lap 44, Park passed Gordon for the lead. Two laps later, the yellow flag was waved when rain started to fall on the track. The race was eventually stopped with Stacy Compton leading when everyone made their scheduled pit stops.
The race was red flagged, and eventually postponed to Monday, February 26 at 11 am Eastern Standard Time. The next day, the race restarted on lap 56, and Gordon took the lead from Compton, who did not make a pit stop before the red flag, and led 18 laps before Park took over the top spot. The race went 188 laps green until Mike Skinner spun out on the backstretch, bringing out the third caution of the event. The race restarted once more, and went 52 more laps before the fourth and final caution came out for oil on the track. The race restarted with 85 laps to go. Gordon led the next thirty, before Park took the lead. With less than 10 laps to go, Bobby Labonte was closing in on Park. Park held off Labonte for his second and to date, most recent Cup win.

Post-race
After crossing the finishing line, Park raised a No. 3 Earnhardt hat that hanged on his gearshift lever and thrust it out of the car to holding it high in tribute to Earnhardt. Park also performed a spin, drove towards Michael Waltrip and made a brief stop with the exchanging a high-five. As Park celebrated, he received a call from Earnhardt's wife Teresa Earnhardt who watched the race at the Dale Earnhardt, Inc. shop in Mooresville, North Carolina. According to Park, Teresa was emotional, but happy. The race took three hours, thirty-four minutes and twenty-one seconds to complete, and the margin of victory was 0.138 seconds.

Race results

References

Dura Lube 400
Dura Lube 400
NASCAR races at Rockingham Speedway